The 1961–62 Northern Football League season was the 65th in the history of Northern Football League, a football competition in England.

Clubs

Division One featured 16 clubs which competed in the league last season, no new clubs joined the league this season.

League table

References

Northern Football League seasons
1961–62 in English football leagues